Carolyn Clark may refer to:

Charlotte Clark (died 1960), American seamstress who created the first line of Mickey Mouse dolls
Carolyn Pollan (born 1937), née Clark, American politician
Carolyn Ann Clark (born 1958), a cast member on American soap opera Guiding Light
Carolyn Clark, co-founder the New Jersey Ballet

See also
Caroline Clark (born 1990), American water polo player